Franz Schieß (21 February 1921 – 2 September 1943) was a Luftwaffe fighter ace. He claimed 67 victories in 657 missions, (14 on the Eastern Front, and 53 against the Western Allies) whilst flying the Messerschmitt Bf 109.

War time service

During the Polish campaign, he saw service in the Army before transferring to the Luftwaffe and undergoing fighter pilot training in 1940. Schieß was posted to the Geschwaderstab (Headquarters) of Jagdgeschwader 53, based on the Channel front in March 1941, then served, from December 1941, as Geschwader Adjutant. Staying there for nearly two years, he established a close friendship with the Geschwaderkommodore (wing commander) Günther Freiherr von Maltzahn.

On 22 June 1941, the opening day of Operation Barbarossa, Schieß scored his first victories destroying an I-153 biplane fighter and an Ilyushin DB-3 bomber. The members of his Staffel called him "Nawratil", after his radio call sign name.

After achieving 14 kills on the Eastern Front he was withdrawn in August, along with the rest of JG 53 and, following rest and refitting in Germany, then deployed in December to the Mediterranean. Operating from Sicily, Schieß flew sorties over Malta scoring 11 victories. Throughout 1942, and re-equipped with the new Bf 109G-2, he outscored his Geschwaderkommodore. In November, the Stab flight itself transferred to Tunisia, where Schieß continued his success, gaining a further 13 victories, including a B-17 four-engined bomber on 29 January 1943 (36th v.)

Leutnant Schieß was awarded the German Cross in Gold on 23 January 1943 as a member of Stab/JG 53. On 16 February 1943, the now Oberleutnant Schieß was appointed Staffelkapitän (squadron leader) of 8./JG 53. He was regarded as one of the most enthusiastic and aggressive pilots in the Mediterranean theatre, and often flew the escort missions for the Ju 52 transports as they tried to evacuate personnel out of Africa. On 18 April he shot down a Spitfire (for his 43rd victory), but nevertheless 24 heavy-laden transports were shot down and a further 35 damaged, in what became known as the "Palm Sunday Massacre".

Even when his unit was evacuated back to Sicily after the fall of Tunis in April 1943, he still flew over to Tunisia each day doing combat missions before returning to Sicily each night, writing home of "wonderful aerial combats". He went on to score 29 victories as leader of 8./JG 53 and reached 50 kills shooting down a P-38 over the sea south of Sicily on 21 May. Schieß was awarded the Knight's Cross on 21 June for 55 victories and then was sent on leave for 2 months, thereby missing the air battles over the invasion of Sicily. Returning to 8./JG 53 in mid-August, his unit was now flying out of southern Italy against the Allies, who were mounting a concerted campaign to destroy the transport net prior to an invasion of the Italian mainland. Schieß shot down 12 enemy aircraft in 11 days, of which seven were P-38 twin-engine fighters. Together with Jürgen Harder of III./JG 53, Schieß was promoted to the rank of Hauptmann on September 1, 1943.

Death
The next day, on 2 September 1943, Schieß led a scramble against a USAAF B-25 bomber formation attacking rail marshalling yards at Cancello, Naples. His unit engaged the fighter escort of P-38 Lightnings. Unable to break through the fighter screen to attack the bombers, he followed the force back over the Gulf of Salerno. His final battle took place over the island of Ischia; at around 1:45PM, the pilots heard Franz Schieß radio: "At them again, everyone get ready!" At the time, the formation was 30 to 40 km southwest of Ischia when Hauptmann Schieß's wingman was forced away by two Lightnings and lost sight of his Staffelkapitän. Though not witnessed, he was probably shot down by a P-38.

On September 27 Günther von Maltzahn wrote to Schieß's parents expressing the close friendship they shared:
I ask that you and your husband accept my and my Geschwader's most sincere and heartfelt sympathy on the unspeakably hard stroke of fate which befell your son Franz.

I can sympathize with how hard it must be to come to terms with thoughts that you will never see your son Franz again in this life. One could not have wished for a better officer. Not only did there exist a comradeship and a mutual trust between Kommodore and adjutant that was tested in far more than 100 air battles, but in him I lost my best friend, on whom I could depend no matter what the situation.

He is credited with 67 aerial victories in 657 missions. Among those were 17 P-38 Lightnings, making him the highest scoring "Lightning-Killer" of the war.

Summary of career

Aerial victory claims
According to US historian David T. Zabecki, Schieß was credited with 67 aerial victories. Spick also lists Schieß with 67 aerial victories claimed in 540 combat missions. This figure includes 13 aerial victories in North Africa, a further 40 aerial victories in the Mediterranean theater and 14 more on the Eastern Front. Mathews and Foreman, authors of Luftwaffe Aces — Biographies and Victory Claims, researched the German Federal Archives and found documentation for 68 aerial victory claims, plus one further unconfirmed claim. This number includes 14 claims on the Eastern Front and 54 over the Western Allies, including three four-engined bombers.

Awards
 Honour Goblet of the Luftwaffe on 7 September 1942 as Leutnant and pilot
 German Cross in Gold on 23 January 1943 as Leutnant in Stab/Jagdgeschwader 53
 Knight's Cross of the Iron Cross on 21 June 1943 as Oberleutnant and Staffelkapitän of the 8./Jagdgeschwader 53

Notes

References

Citations

Bibliography 

 
 
 
 
 
 
 
 
 
 
 
 Smith, J.Richard & Pegg, Martin (2003). Jagdwaffe Vol 3, Sec3: War over the Desert June 1940 – June 1942	Hersham, Surrey: Ian Allan Publishing	
 Roba, Jean-Louis & Pegg, Martin (2003). Jagdwaffe Vol 4, Sec2: The Mediterranean 1942 – 1943  Hersham, Surrey: Ian Allan Publishing     including colour profile of aircraft (p. 167)
 
 
 
 Weal, John (2001). Bf109 Aces of the Russian Front. Oxford: Osprey Publishing Limited. .
 
 

1921 births
1943 deaths
Aviators killed by being shot down
Luftwaffe pilots
German World War II flying aces
Austrian aviators
Luftwaffe personnel killed in World War II
Missing in action of World War II
Recipients of the Gold German Cross
Recipients of the Knight's Cross of the Iron Cross
People from Sankt Pölten